Hopkins Wade "Buddy" Tatum Jr. (born 1958) is a bronze sculptor from Corpus Christi, Texas. His works include El Circo Del Mar, as well as a life-sized statue of late Tejano singer Selena Quintanilla located at Mirador de la Flor. He both sculpts and casts his bronzes.

References

Living people
People from Corpus Christi, Texas
Sculptors from Texas
1958 births